Esporte Clube Flamengo, or usually called Flamengo do Piauí, are a Brazilian football team from Teresina in Piauí, Brazil founded on December 8, 1937. Their home stadium is the Albertão, which has a maximum capacity of 60,000 people. Their kit is black and red shirts, black shorts and red and black socks. Flamengo has competed in the Série A several times. Despite having the same name and colors, they should not be confused with the more well known and popular Flamengo from Rio de Janeiro.

History
Esporte Clube Flamengo were founded on December 8, 1937. The club has won the Campeonato Piauiense 17 times, making them the second most successful club in that competition.

Flamengo has competed in the Taça Brasil twice. Their debut was in 1965 when they were eliminated in the first round of the Northern Group by Sampaio Corrêa. In 1966, they reached the semifinal of the Northern Group and they were beaten by Paysandu.

The club has also competed in the Série A several times. Flamengo's debut was in 1976, when they were eliminated in the first stage. Flamengo finished in last place of their group in 1977 and in 1978. Flamengo returned in 1980, being eliminated again in the first stage. Five years later, the club competed again, finishing in eighth position of their group. Flamengo competed in the 2000 Copa João Havelange, reaching the Green Module's second stage. Flamengo competed in the debut competition of the Copa do Brasil 1989, and they were eliminated in the first round by Guarani. The club competed in several additional editions of the cup.

Achievements
Campeonato Piauiense: 17
1939, 1942, 1944, 1945, 1946, 1964, 1965, 1970, 1971, 1976, 1979, 1984, 1986, 1987, 1988, 2003, 2009

Copa Piauí: 4
2008, 2009, 2012, 2013

Stadium
Flamengo play their home games at Estádio Governador Alberto Tavares Silva, commonly known as Albertão, located in Teresina. The stadium has a maximum capacity of 60,000 people and was inaugurated on August 26, 1973.

Rival
The rivalry between Flamengo and River is known as Rivengo. The derby's first ever game was played on April 25, 1948 and ended 0 – 0.

References

 
Association football clubs established in 1937
1937 establishments in Brazil